Eldorado Jones (1860–1932) was an American inventor nicknamed the "Iron Woman". Her factory in Moline, Illinois, mainly employed women over the age of 40. Best known for inventing an airplane muffler, she also developed a lightweight electric iron, a travel-size ironing board, a collapsible hat-rack, and an "anti-damp salt shaker".

Jones was born in 1860 in Palmyra, Missouri. Her family moved to St. Louis, and her father, Alonzo Jones, deserted them. Eldorado first took work as a teacher in Lafayette, Indiana; detesting this job, she became a stenographer at an insurance company in Chicago.

By 1913, however, Jones had become an inventor. She opened an all-women factory in Moline, Illinois, dedicated to manufacturing her creations. She devised an airplane muffler in 1919. Following tests at Roosevelt Field, she patented the invention in 1923. Time magazine described the muffler in action:Puffing upon one cigaret after another, Miss Jones directed mechanics in attaching to the Cirrus engine of a Moth biplane a muffler of her own invention. As the plane sped along the runway and over the hangars there were noises—of thrumming propeller, snapping pistons, vibrating metal—but there was no bark of exhaust.As Popular Science reported in 1931, the muffler reduced noise without reducing power. That same year, Modern Mechanics and Inventions described it as "the first successful exhaust muffler for airplane engines." The muffler used "a series of small pinwheels which 'chew up' the sound waves and retard the passage of exhaust gases without creating undue back pressure upon the engine."

Jones was known for her "energy, her self-reliance, and her general distrust of men." Her disdain hampered the muffler's financial success, according to historian Anne MacDonald.

The New York Times marked her death in 1932 with the headline Woman Inventor Dies in Poverty. The obituary closed with a quotation from Jones: "Do not forget to exploit men all you can. Because if you don't, they will exploit you."

References

External links 
 Clipping from Eugene Register
 "Finding Eldorado (my search for The Iron Woman)
 Sharon Hall, "Mothers of Invention: Eldorado Jones (Airplane Muffler)", Digging History, 2014

1860 births
1932 deaths
20th-century American inventors
Women inventors